The Ringleader: Mixtape Volume III is a 2003 Christian hip hop album mixed by DJ Maj.  It was his first commercial success.  While it is his third mixtape for Gotee Records, his first two received little media attention.  This DJ mix has an overall hip hop feel, but some tracks, specifically "Under Pressure", "A Friend", and "Showpiece", are more precisely rhythm and blues. While the album combines the talents of many different artists, the theme that God is in control is a maintained through all the tracks. The Ringleader marked the debut solo for Jason Eskridge, who had previously been a guest singer with GRITS in Grammatical Revolution. Other artists represented include tobyMac, Kirk Franklin, Out of Eden, LA Symphony, 4th Avenue Jones, Camp Quest, GRITS, Verbs, Bobby Bishop, Shonlock, and Pigeon John.

References

DJ Maj albums
DJ mix albums
2003 mixtape albums
Gotee Records compilation albums